Boyan may refer to:

People
 Bojan, a common Slavic given name spelled as Boyan in Bulgarian
 Boyan (bard) (10th–11th century), a bard active at the court of Yaroslav the Wise
 Boyan (given name), a common Bulgarian given name
 Boyan (Hasidic dynasty), a dynasty of Hasidic Jewish rabbis
 Boyan Ensemble, touring choir of the L. Revutsky Capella of Ukraine
 Boyan-Enravota (died 833), the first Bulgarian Christian martyr and the earliest Bulgarian saint
 Bayan of the Baarin or Boyan (1236–1295), Mongol general
 Bayan of the Merkid or Boyan (died 1340), Mongol general

Ethnic group
 The indigenous people from Bawean Island

Places
 3681 Boyan, a main-belt asteroid 
 Boyan (village), a village in Venets Municipality, Shumen Province, Bulgaria
 Boyan, Wu'an, town in southern Hebei, China
 Boyan Botevo, a village in Mineralni Bani, in Haskovo Province, Bulgaria
 Boyan, the Yiddish name of Boiany, a city in Bukovina 
 Boyan, an alternative name for Bawean, an island in Indonesia
 Kampung Boyan, place in Malaysia

See also
Boyana (disambiguation)